Ionuț Justinian Larie (born 16 January 1987) is a Romanian professional footballer who plays as a centre-back for Liga I club Farul Constanța, which he captains.

Club career
On 31 January 2019, Larie  left FC Tobol by mutual consent.

Career statistics

Club

Honours
CFR Cluj
Cupa României: 2015–16
Supercupa României runner-up: 2016

Individual
Liga I Team of the Season: 2016–17

References

External links

1987 births
Living people
Sportspeople from Constanța
Romanian footballers
Romania under-21 international footballers
Association football defenders
Liga I players
FC Viitorul Constanța players
CFR Cluj players
CS Gaz Metan Mediaș players
FC Steaua București players
Liga II players
FC Delta Dobrogea Tulcea players
FCV Farul Constanța players
CS Portul Constanța players
SCM Râmnicu Vâlcea players
Kazakhstan Premier League players
FC Tobol players
Romanian expatriate footballers
Romanian expatriate sportspeople in Kazakhstan
Expatriate footballers in Kazakhstan